Reversal may refer to:
 Medical reversal, when a medical intervention falls out of use after improved clinical trials demonstrate its ineffectiveness or harmfulness.
 Reversal (law), the setting aside of a decision of a lower court by a higher court
 In drama, "reversal" refers to Aristotle's concept of Peripeteia
 Reversal film, a type of photographic film also known as slide or transparency film
 The Reversal, a novel by Michael Connelly
 Reversal of polarization (disambiguation)
 Reversal (wrestling), in which the defensive contender achieves an offensive position
 Reversal (film), a movie about wrestling
 Reversal, an options-trading strategy
 Reversal of a word in formal language
 "Reversal" (Arrow), an episode of Arrow
 Russian reversal is a type of joke, usually starting with the words "In Soviet Russia", in which the subject and objects of a statement are reversed, commonly as a snowclone pattern

See also
Reverse (disambiguation)
Reversion (disambiguation)